The Iowa–Iowa State rivalry is an American college rivalry between the Iowa Hawkeyes sports teams of the University of Iowa and the Iowa State Cyclones sports teams of Iowa State University. The two universities currently compete with each other in the Iowa Corn Cy-Hawk Series, which awards points for athletic victories over the other university. The two schools also compete for the Cy-Hawk Trophy, which is awarded to the winner of the annual football game between the two schools.

Iowa and Iowa State rank as the top two universities in Iowa in terms of enrollment. Iowa State University, located in Ames, had a fall 2015 enrollment of 36,001 which is the largest in school history. As of the fall 2015 semester, the University of Iowa, located in Iowa City, had 32,150 students enrolled. The two schools compete in a wide range of sports, including wrestling, golf, volleyball, soccer, cross country, swimming, gymnastics, and softball, among major sports such as football and basketball.

Football series

Men's basketball series 

Iowa leads the all-time series 47-28 as of the 2020-21 season.

Wrestling

Notes 

College basketball rivalries in the United States
College sports rivalries in the United States
Iowa Hawkeyes
Iowa State Cyclones
1894 establishments in Iowa